Malavika Nair is an Indian actress who predominantly appears in Malayalam films. She has appeared in more than 20 films, mostly as a child artist and is a two time recipient of the Kerala State Film Award for Best Child Artist, in 2006 and 2012.

Personal life
Malavika Nair was born in Thrissur.

Education 
Malavika Nair became the topper in journalism and mass communication in the academic year 2020–2022 at St Teresa's College, Ernakulam.

Career 
Malavika began her career as a child actress in Malayalam television serials. Malayalam film director Shri. Kamal then cast her in his acclaimed film Karutha Pakshikal. This role won her the Kerala State Film Award. She has also acted in other Malayalam movies – Yes Your Honour, Maya Bazar, Orkkuka Vallappozhum, Shikkar, Penpattanam, Kandahar, Little Master, Vaadhyar, The Reporter, Oomakkuyil Padumbol, Naughty Professor, Ithra Mathram, and Omega.Exe.. She has completed 19 years in the film Industry.

Awards
Malavika got her first Kerala State Film Award for Best Child Artist for her portrayal of a poor blind girl, Malli, in the movie Karutha Pakshikal released in 2006. She got her second Kerala State Film Award for Best Child Artist for her role as Reema in Oomakkuyil Padumbol.

Filmography

Television

References

External links

 
 

Living people
Indian film actresses
Actresses in Malayalam cinema
Child actresses in Malayalam cinema
21st-century Indian child actresses
Year of birth missing (living people)
Indian television actresses
Actresses in Malayalam television
Indian television child actresses
Actresses from Thrissur